Supoj Wonghoi is a professional footballer from Thailand. He currently plays for Uthai Thani in the Thai League 3.

Honours

Club
Uthai Thani
Thai League 3 (1): 2021–22
Thai League 3 Northern Region (1): 2021–22

References

http://th.soccerway.com/players/suphot-wonghoi/287865/

Living people
Supoj Wonghoi
1987 births
Association football defenders
Supoj Wonghoi
Supoj Wonghoi
Supoj Wonghoi
Supoj Wonghoi
Supoj Wonghoi
Supoj Wonghoi